Eugnathogobius siamensis is a species of goby.

It has been found in China, Thailand, Malaysia, Singapore, Brunei, and Indonesia.

References 

Gobionellinae
Taxa named by Henry Weed Fowler
Fish described in 1934